The Glăvănești is a left tributary of the river Jijia in Romania. It flows into the Jijia in Andrieșeni.

References

Rivers of Romania
Rivers of Botoșani County
Rivers of Iași County